Todd Andrew Simon (born April 21, 1972) is a Canadian former professional ice hockey centre.

Biography
As a youth, Simon played in the 1985 Quebec International Pee-Wee Hockey Tournament with the Toronto Young Nationals minor ice hockey team.

Simon played junior ice hockey for the Niagara Falls Thunder of the Ontario Hockey League. He won the Eddie Powers Memorial Trophy as the league's leading scorer in the 1991–92 OHL season.

He was drafted in the ninth round, 203rd overall, by the Buffalo Sabres in the 1992 NHL Entry Draft. He played fifteen games in the National Hockey League with the Sabres in the 1993–94 regular season, recording one assist, and five more during the 1994 Stanley Cup Playoffs, during which he recorded a goal.

Career statistics

References

External links

1972 births
Buffalo Sabres draft picks
Buffalo Sabres players
Canadian expatriate ice hockey players in Germany
Canadian ice hockey centres
Cincinnati Cyclones (IHL) players
Detroit Vipers players
Grizzlys Wolfsburg players
Essen Mosquitoes players
Hannover Scorpions players
Jewish Canadian sportspeople
Jewish ice hockey players
Las Vegas Thunder players
Living people
Niagara Falls Thunder players
Rochester Americans players
Ice hockey people from Toronto